The 1973–74 NCAA Division II men's ice hockey season began in November 1973 and concluded in March of the following year. This was the 10th season of second-tier college ice hockey.

In 1973 the NCAA changed to a numerical classification system. As a result, the College division of ice hockey was split into Division II and Division III.

Regular season

Season tournaments

Standings

See also
 1973–74 NCAA Division I men's ice hockey season
 1973–74 NCAA Division III men's ice hockey season

References

External links

 
NCAA